The International Printing Machinery and Allied Trades Exhibition (IPEX) was the longest running printing and graphic arts trade show in the English-speaking world. The trade show was held every four years except for the final show, which was held after three. IPEX was an international event, serving both the UK and the international print industry. 

IPEX 2017 took place at the NEC, Birmingham, UK, on 31 October - 3 November 2017. In 2018 the organisers announced that the 2017 exhibition had been the last.

See also 
 Drupa, the largest printing equipment exhibition in the world

External links 
 
 Organisers

Typography
Trade fairs in the United Kingdom
Quadrennial events